Lúnasa or Lughnasadh is a Gaelic festival marking the beginning of the harvest season.

Lúnasa may also refer to:
 Lúnasa (band), a traditional Irish band 
 Lúnasa (album), a 1998 album by Lúnasa